Aida Hadžialić (born 21 January 1987) is a Bosnian-born Swedish politician and a member of the Social Democrats. She served as Minister for Upper Secondary School, Adult Education and Training from 3 October 2014 until her resignation on 15 August 2016. Prior to joining the government she served as deputy mayor 2010–2014 in Halmstad, Halland.

Since 7 September 2019, she is the leader of the opposition in Stockholm County.

She holds a Master of Laws (LL.M.) from the University of Lund, Sweden. In 2014 she also began studies at the Stockholm School of Economics before becoming a member of the government.

Hadžialić is an international Baccalaureate alumna, being fluent in Swedish, English and Bosnian.

She resigned from her position as a minister 13 August 2016 after a visit to Copenhagen whereafter she drove just above the legal alcohol limit on the Swedish bridgehead of the Øresund Bridge. The control indicated 0.2 per mille which was exactly on the limit. Hadžialić was however driving legally on the Danish side of the Øresund Bridge where the legal drinking limit is 0,5 per mille.

She has on numerous occasions been voted as one of the most talented young leaders in Sweden.

Hadžialić currently runs a consultancy firm specializing in global affairs, Nordic West Office, which she founded with Jorma Ollila, Risto E.J Penttilä, Kristiina Helenius and Charles C. Adams Jr. She also serves as an advisor to the BMW Foundation.

References

External links

1987 births
Living people
People from Foča
Lund University alumni
Swedish Social Democratic Party politicians
Women government ministers of Sweden
Swedish people of Bosnia and Herzegovina descent
Bosnia and Herzegovina emigrants to Sweden
Swedish Ministers for Education
21st-century Swedish women politicians
21st-century Swedish lawyers